The Disobedient is a 2014 Serbian drama film written, directed and produced by Mina Djukic. The film premiered in-competition in the World Cinema Dramatic Competition at 2014 Sundance Film Festival on January 20, 2014.

The film later premiered at the 2014 International Film Festival Rotterdam on January 29, 2014. The film also screened at 13th !f Istanbul AFM International Independent Film Festival on February 13, 2014.

After its premiere at the Sundance Film Festival, Sundance Channel acquired the rights of the film for all territories where the channel is seen. It was one of six films shortlisted by Serbia to be their submission for the Academy Award for Best Foreign Language Film at the 88th Academy Awards, but it lost out to Enclave.

Plot
Childhood best friends, Leni and Lazar reconnect when Lazar returns from his extensive travels abroad for his father's funeral. They embark on a bicycle trip together, during this trip Leni must decide that is there strong enough connection between them to build a life together.

Cast
Hana Selimović as Leni
Mladen Sovilj as Lazar
Minja Subota as Narator
Danijel Šike as Cora
Ivan Đorđević as Jovan
Aleksandra Pleskonjic as Slavica
Raslav Sekulović as mali Lazar
Marko Janjić as Miljan
Branka Šelić as Ana
Žarko Radić as Aleks
Dunja Tatić

Reception
The Disobedient received mixed reviews upon its premiere at the 2014 Sundance Film Festival. Dennis Harvey of Variety, said in his review that "There’s nothing wrong with “The Disobedient” that an actual script couldn’t have helped, at the very least. In all other departments, it’s quite smartly turned, the dominating contribution (and pleasure) being Djorde Arambasic’s often lovely, mostly outdoor photography. Screener viewed lacked closing credits." Stephen Farber in his review for The Hollywood Reporter called the film "Painfully slow Serbian road movie offers few rewards for American viewers."

However, Mark Adams from Screen International praised the film by saying that "A lush and lyrical tale, rich in its presentation of tantalising pastoral romance set against a beautiful sunbaked landscape." Ben Umstead of Twitch Film also gave the film a positive review and said that "it is the celebration of youth, and the understanding that we should cherish it while we can, for it won't always be the same."

Accolades

References

External links
 
 

2014 films
2014 drama films
Serbian drama films